The Conference for Change in Syria, or Antalya Opposition Conference, was a three-day conference of representatives of the Syrian opposition held from 31 May until 3 June 2011 in Antalya, Turkey. Since the early days of the Syrian civil uprising, it was the second of its kind, following the Istanbul Meeting for Syria that had taken place on 26 April 2011.

Organized by Ammar al-Qurabi's National Organization for Human Rights in Syria and financed by the wealthy Damascene Sanqar family, it led to a final statement refusing compromise or reform solutions, and to the election of a 31-member leadership.

Background
More than two months into the uprising, the death toll had reached 1,000. So after the April 2011 Istanbul Meeting had only resulted in a first joint declaration, a second meeting was envisioned to form a permanent committee, that was likened to the Libyan National Transitional Council.

On 30 May, the eve of the conference, Syrian president Bashar al-Assad offered a general amnesty for prisoners, including those deemed to have committed "political crimes." The opposition however rejected the offer, considering it as just another plot by the regime to gain time. Mohammad Abdullah, son of political prisoner Ali al-Abdullah and a Washington-based Syrian dissident attending the conference, stated: "This shows weakness on the part of the regime.”

Participation
The conference was attended by c. 350 representatives of the Syrian opposition from all over the world, with a vast majority of c. 300 participants coming from the Syrian diaspora. According to the observing Tharwa Foundation, the participants represented more than 68 opposition parties and groups and a dozen human rights groups. While only few prominent oppositional figures from inside Syria participated, others, including Haitham al-Maleh, gave their support through voice recordings.

Participants included members of Arab tribes, the Muslim Brotherhood, Kurds, Alawites, Turkmen, Druzes, Christians, Assyrians, Yezidis, intellectuals (academician, artist, scientist), nongovernmental organizations, the representatives of prominent provinces, Leaders of the Damascus Declaration, Syrian exilees from Europe, the United States, the Middle East, and Turkey.

The conference was the first one to be attended by reporters from all major global news outlets, including BBC, CNN, France 24, Al Jazeera, Al Arabiya, Alhurra, the Associated Press, Reuters, AFP, The New York Times, The Wall Street Journal and numerous Turkish and European media outlets.

Results

Final Declaration 
The conference concluded with a Final Declaration that displayed a change of tone regarding the Syrian government. Calling on president Bashar al-Assad to step down and to resign immediately from all of his duties and positions, this was the first time since the beginning of the uprising that the opposition dropped its calls for reform.

The final declaration consisted of the following seven demands:

Elected councils 
 Consultative Council
The participants elected a follow-up Consultative Council of 31 members to coordinate all further activities supportive of the envisioned Syrian revolution. The slate-based list included 4 Kurds, 4 members of Arab tribes, 4 members of the Muslim Brotherhood, 4 supporters of the Damascus Declaration, plus 10 under 30 years-old independents and 5 over-30 years old independents and received over 200 out of some 250 votes.

The elected members were as following:

 Hussain Abdelhadi
 Tamer al-Awam
 Amr al-Azm
 Amir al-Dandal
 Mulham al-Droubi
 Moatasim Ibrahim al-Hariri
 Ahmad Fahed Ibrahim al-Hodeideen
 Muhammad Murad al-Khaznawi
 Nour al-Masri
 Ghassan al-Mifleh
 Omar al-Muqdad
 Salim Abdulaziz al-Muslet
 Moaz al-Sibaai
 Mosab Salih al-Tahhan
 Radwan Badini
 Najib Ghadbian
 Ahmad Riyad Ghannam
 Abdurrhaman Jleilati
 Muhammad Karkouti
 Mohammad Mansour
 Salim Monem
 Wajdi Moustafa
 Hamdi Othman
 Ammar al-Qurabi
 Muhammad Rasheed
 Muhammad Sadik Sheikh Deeb
 Sondos Sulaiman
 Walid Sheikho
 Khawla Yusuf
 Radwan Ziadeh
 Aksam Barakat 

 Executive Council
Additionally an Executive Council was elected with the following nine members:

 Amr al-Azm
 Mulham al-Droubi
 Ahed al-Hindi
 Radwan Badini
 Muhammad Karkouti
 Abdel Ilah Milhem
 Ammar al-Qurabi
 Sondos Sulaiman
 Khawla Yusuf

Reactions and scholarly opinions 
Burhan Ghalioun, first chairman of the later Syrian National Council, criticized the event as "serving foreign agendas," which prompted one of the organizers, Abdulrazak Eid, to accuse Ghalioun of attempting to appease the regime.

According to Swedish MENA-expert Aron Lund, the Muslim Brotherhood played "a central role" in the conference, while Kurds were "poorly represented". Paris-based political economist and publicist Samir Aita considered the Antalya conference as the turning point from an uprising for "freedom and dignity" towards a full-scale revolution. While all other opposition groups were looking to create the National Coordination Committee for Democratic Change (NCB), Aita sees in the conference a first attempt of the Muslim Brotherhood and the Syrian Democratic People's Party, main component of the Damascus Declaration body, to head out on a different path.

Aftermath 
The conference was succeeded by a Muslim Brotherhood-organized follow-up meeting two days later in Brussels, and another one in Paris that was addressed by Bernard Henri Levy It however took a number of further meetings in Istanbul and Doha, before at yet another meeting on 23 August in Istanbul created a permanent transitional council in form of the Syrian National Council.

References

Bibliography

 

Syrian opposition
2011 in the Syrian civil war
2011 in Turkey
International conferences in Turkey
21st century in Antalya
May 2011 events in Turkey
June 2011 events in Turkey